Sam Perrin (August 15, 1901 - January 8, 1998) was an American screenwriter.

Biography
Perrin was born to a Jewish family. He died in Woodland Hills, Los Angeles, California.

References

External links

American male screenwriters
Emmy Award winners
1901 births
1998 deaths
20th-century American male writers
20th-century American screenwriters